Kerrier was a non-metropolitan district in Cornwall, England. It was abolished on 1 April 2009 and replaced by Cornwall Council.

Political control
The first election to the council was held in 1973, initially operating as a shadow authority before coming into its powers on 1 April 1974. Political control of the council from 1973 until the council's abolition in 2009 was held by the following parties:

Leadership
The leaders of the council from 2007 until the council's abolition were:

Council elections
1973 Kerrier District Council election
1976 Kerrier District Council election
1979 Kerrier District Council election (New ward boundaries)
1983 Kerrier District Council election
1987 Kerrier District Council election
1991 Kerrier District Council election
1995 Kerrier District Council election
1999 Kerrier District Council election
2003 Kerrier District Council election (New ward boundaries)
2007 Kerrier District Council election

By-election results

References

External links
Kerrier Council

Council elections in Cornwall
District council elections in England